is a private junior college in Chūō-ku, Kobe in Hyōgo Prefecture, Japan.

History 
The school was founded in 1880. In 2013, it became coeducational.

Courses
It offers courses in childcare.

See also 
 Kobe Shukugawa Gakuin University
 List of junior colleges in Japan

References

External links 
  

Educational institutions established in 1965
Japanese junior colleges
1965 establishments in Japan
Universities and colleges in Hyōgo Prefecture
Private universities and colleges in Japan